East Seaham is a primarily rural suburb of the Port Stephens local government area in the Hunter Region of New South Wales, Australia. It is situated on the east bank of the Williams River, opposite Glen Oak and Seaham.

The Greswick Public School operated in East Seaham between 1895 and 1937, supported by the development of farms in and around East Seaham. The schoolhouse was moved to Seaham after a bushfire in 1939 and operated as Seaham Public School until the 1960s.

Notes

References

Suburbs of Port Stephens Council